Richard Hutchinson may refer to:

Richard A. Hutchinson (1853–1921), American politician
Richard Hutchinson (MP), English politician, MP for Rochester
Richard Hutchinson, film producer, of The Secret Adventures of Tom Thumb
Richard Hutchinson (composer) (1590–1646), English organist and composer
Dick Hutchinson (1890–1977), Australian rules footballer

See also
Richard Hutchison (1812–1891), Canadian businessman and politician
Richard Hely-Hutchinson (disambiguation)